Alica Javadová (born 26 June 1969) is a retired Slovak high jumper.

She finished eighth at the 1996 European Indoor Championships. She also competed at the 1995 World Championships and the 1996 Olympic Games without reaching the final.

Her personal best jump is 1.95 metres, achieved in May 1996 in Bratislava.

References

1969 births
Living people
Slovak female high jumpers
Athletes (track and field) at the 1996 Summer Olympics
Olympic athletes of Slovakia